David G. Lowe is a Canadian computer scientist working for Google as a Senior Research Scientist. He was a former professor in the Computer Science Department at the University of British Columbia and New York University.

Works
Lowe is a researcher in computer vision, and is the author of the patented scale-invariant feature transform (SIFT), one of the most popular algorithms in the detection and description of  image features.

Awards and honors
 2015. Lowe received the biennial PAMI Distinguished Researcher Award.

References

External links
 Home page

Canadian computer scientists
Computer vision researchers
Living people
Academic staff of the University of British Columbia
Year of birth missing (living people)